The Korail Class 368000 is one of the Rapid class of trains operated by Korail. It is manufactured by Hyundai Rotem and used on the ITX-Cheongchun Line. The doors are placed such that they fit the Korail metro screen doors on the Gyeongchun Line.

References
Railway Systems-Project Record View

Korail
Electric multiple units of South Korea

25 kV AC multiple units
Hyundai Rotem multiple units